The Edwards River is a river of New Zealand. A tributary of the Bealey River, it arises in the Polar Range to the east of Arthur's Pass and flows south-west within Arthur's Pass National Park. The Mingha River joins it just before it enters the Bealey. It is one of the headwaters of the Waimakariri River.

A tramping track runs part of the way along the river to a backcountry hut.

See also
List of rivers of New Zealand

References

Land Information New Zealand - Search for Place Names

Rivers of Canterbury, New Zealand
Rivers of New Zealand